Pronovias is a wedding dress design business based in Catalonia, Spain. BC Partners acquired a 90 percent stake in the firm in 2017 for 550 million Euros. In 2018, Amandine Ohayon took over from d'Andrés Tejero as the company's CEO. Manuel Mota Cerrillo was the company's creative director for 23 years until his death in 2013.

The company's work includes wedding dresses such as a sequined next-to-nude beaded bodysuit adorned with Swarovski crystals. Pronovias designed the lacy wedding dress Maria Menounos wore on her December 31, 2017, wedding night in Times Square.

On December 20, 2022, the Pronovias Group announced that the company will be acquired by a group of investors led by Bain Capital and MV Credit. The company's acquisition process is expected to be completed in early 2023.

References

Clothing companies of Spain
Companies based in Barcelona
Wedding dress designers
Marriage in Spain
2017 mergers and acquisitions
Announced mergers and acquisitions